Aris Palaiochori Football Club is a Greek football club based in Palaiochori, Chalkidiki, Greece.

Honours

Domestic

 Chalkidiki FCA Champions: 3
 1991–92, 1996–97, 2016–17
 Chalkidiki FCA Cup Winners: 3
 1983–84, 1992–93, 1996–97

References

Football clubs in Central Macedonia
Chalkidiki
Association football clubs established in 1952
1952 establishments in Greece
Gamma Ethniki clubs